A constitutional referendum was held in South Korea on 17 October 1969. The changes to the constitution were approved by 67.5% of valid ballots, with a turnout of 77%.

Results

References

1969 referendums
1969 elections in South Korea
Constitutional referendums in South Korea